Palle Jensen (born January 8, 1953) is a former Danish handball player who competed in the 1976 Summer Olympics and in the 1980 Summer Olympics.

He was born in Sønderborg.

In 1976 he was part of the Danish team which finished eighth in the Olympic tournament. He played all six matches and scored ten goals.

Four years later he finished ninth with the Danish team in the 1980 Olympic tournament. He played five matches and scored eight goals.

He's now working as a senior teacher at Virum Skole in Denmark.

External links
 profile

1953 births
Living people
Danish male handball players
Olympic handball players of Denmark
Handball players at the 1976 Summer Olympics
Handball players at the 1980 Summer Olympics
People from Sønderborg Municipality
Sportspeople from the Region of Southern Denmark